Wade Eric Taylor (born October 19, 1965, in Mobile, Alabama) is an American pitching coach and former Major League Baseball pitcher who played with the New York Yankees in . He has been an advance scout for the Yankees, Arizona Diamondbacks, Washington Nationals and Los Angeles Dodgers.

Taylor played college baseball at the University of Miami. On June 30, he was signed by the Seattle Mariners as an amateur free agent.

He pitched in 12 games for Seattle's Single-A minor league affiliate, the Bellingham Mariners, in 1987. 
 
On December 22, 1987, Taylor was traded with Lee Guetterman and Clay Parker to the New York Yankees in exchange for Henry Cotto and Steve Trout. After spending three full years in the Yankees minor league system, Taylor was called up in early June . Taylor started his first game on June 2 against the Milwaukee Brewers. He pitched 5.1 innings, allowing seven hits and four earned runs. He also struck out four Brewers' hitters and was credited with the win in the Yankees 7–4 defeat of Milwaukee.

In 23 games for the Yankees in 1991, Taylor posted a 7–12 win–loss record, a 6.27 earned run average, and struck out 72 batters in 116.1 innings.

On January 17, 2020, he was announced as the pitching coach for the Milwaukee Milkmen of the American Association of Professional Baseball.

References

External links

1965 births
Living people
Albany-Colonie Yankees players
Arizona Diamondbacks scouts
Baseball coaches from Alabama
Baseball players from Alabama
Bellingham Mariners players
Columbus Clippers players
Fort Lauderdale Yankees players
Greenville Bluesmen players
Gulf Coast Yankees players
Jefferson Davis Warhawks baseball players
Los Angeles Dodgers scouts
Major League Baseball pitchers
Miami Hurricanes baseball players
New York Yankees players
New York Yankees scouts
Prince William Cannons players
Washington Nationals scouts
People from Oviedo, Florida
Navegantes del Magallanes players
American expatriate baseball players in Venezuela